The West Shore Subdivision is a railroad line owned by CSX Transportation in the U.S. state of New York. The line runs from Fairport, CP-359, west to Churchville, CP-382, along the former West Shore Railroad mainline. Both of its ends are at the Rochester Subdivision,  providing  a southern bypass around the city of Rochester. Genesee Junction is located on the West Shore, where CSX interchanges with both the Livonia, Avon and Lakeville Railroad and the Rochester and Southern Railroad.

History
The 1924 plat map of Monroe County, NY, shows the West Shore Division starting at a junction with the main line of the New York Central in Fairport NY and heading west through the town of Perinton, the town and village of Pittsford, the towns of Henrietta and Brighton, then crossing the Genesee River into the town of Chili, crossing the main line of the New York Central in the town of Riga, and then proceeding west out of Monroe County.

The line became part of the New York Central Railroad and Conrail through leases, mergers and takeovers, and was assigned to CSX Transportation in the 1999 breakup of Conrail. The subdivision is governed in its entirety by automatic block signaling.

See also
 List of CSX Transportation lines

References

CSX Transportation lines
Rail infrastructure in New York (state)
New York Central Railroad lines
Railway lines opened in 1884